Daria Valeryevna Shkurikhina (born 3 October 1990) is a Russian group rhythmic gymnast and Olympic champion.

Career 
Shkurikhina was a member of the gold medal-winning Russian group at the 2007 World Championships in Patras, Greece. She also received a gold medal in the group event at the 2008 Summer Olympics in Beijing.

Detailed Olympic results

References

External links
 
 
 

1990 births
Living people
Russian rhythmic gymnasts
Gymnasts at the 2008 Summer Olympics
Olympic gymnasts of Russia
Olympic gold medalists for Russia
Sportspeople from Kazan
Olympic medalists in gymnastics
Medalists at the 2008 Summer Olympics
Medalists at the Rhythmic Gymnastics World Championships
Medalists at the Rhythmic Gymnastics European Championships